Adrian Ciantar (born 9 August 1978 in Malta) is a footballer who is currently without a club

Playing career
Ciantar made his debut with Hibernians in the Maltese Premier League in the season 1997–1998. In the season 2003-2004 he joined Birkirkara. He has played with the Maltese national football team.

External links
 Adrian Ciantar at MaltaFootball.com
 

1978 births
Living people
Hibernians F.C. players
Birkirkara F.C. players
Qormi F.C. players
Maltese footballers
Malta international footballers
Association football midfielders